Union is a village and census-designated place (CDP) in the town of Wakefield, Carroll County, New Hampshire, United States. It had a population of 196 at the 2020 census.

Union has a separate ZIP code (03887) from the rest of the town of Wakefield.

Geography
Union is in the southern corner of the town of Wakefield, along the Branch River, a tributary of the Salmon Falls River. It is bordered to the west by the town of Middleton and to the southeast by the town of Milton, both in Strafford County. New Hampshire Route 16 forms the northeastern edge of the CDP; the highway leads north  to Ossipee and south  to Rochester. New Hampshire Route 153 passes through the northern part of the village, leading north  to Sanbornville and southwest  to Farmington. New Hampshire Route 125 has its northern terminus in Union at Route 16, and leads southeast  to Milton.

Demographics

As of the census of 2010, there were 204 people, 84 households, and 56 families residing in the CDP. There were 93 housing units, of which 9, or 9.7%, were vacant. The racial makeup of the CDP was 98.5% white, 0.5% Native American and 1.0% "some other race". 1.0% of the population were Hispanic or Latino of any race.

Of the 84 households in the CDP, 25.0% had children under the age of 18 living with them, 47.6% were headed by married couples living together, 14.3% had a female householder with no husband present, and 33.3% were non-families. 21.4% of all households were made up of individuals, and 11.9% were someone living alone who was 65 years of age or older. The average household size was 2.43, and the average family size was 2.82.

16.7% of residents in the CDP were under the age of 18, 7.3% were from age 18 to 24, 20.6% were from 25 to 44, 38.7% were from 45 to 64, and 16.7% were 65 years of age or older. The median age was 48.4 years. For every 100 females, there were 98.1 males. For every 100 females age 18 and over, there were 104.8 males.

References

Census-designated places in New Hampshire
Census-designated places in Carroll County, New Hampshire
Wakefield, New Hampshire